I Don't Want to Be a Man is a 1918 German film directed by Ernst Lubitsch.

It was shot at the Tempelhof Studios in Berlin.

Cast 
Ossi Oswalda as Ossi
Curt Goetz as Dr. Kersten
Ferry Sikla as Counsellor Brockmüller
Margarete Kupfer as The Governess
Victor Janson

Plot
High-spirited young Ossi Oswalda is the bane of her uncle and governess' existence. She insists on playing poker and smoking and talks with strange men on the street. When her uncle leaves to take up a new job, she looks forward to enjoying new freedom. Her hopes are dashed when her new guardian Dr. Kersten proves to be strict and unyielding. Frustrated with her cloistered life, Ossi sneaks out on the town dressed as a young man. She finds that being a man has its own disadvantages when she discovers she is not given the same gentle treatment when she is masquerading as a male. She decides to attend a lavish ball in her new disguise. Soon, Dr. Kersten appears at the ball trying to woo a young lady and Ossi vengefully tries to steal her away from her hated guardian. Eventually, another man attracts the woman's attention, and the disguised Ossi and the doctor reconcile. The two proceed to bond over cigars and champagne. After the ball is over, the pair drunkenly stumble home, exchanging inebriated kisses. After they pass out in a hired cab, the driver mistakenly leaves Ossi at the doctor's house and drops off the doctor at Ossi's home. Upon waking up in strange house, Ossi becomes alarmed and runs home where the doctor has woken up and is trying to sneak out of the house undetected. Still in disguise, she pretends she is visiting her cousin Ossi, and the doctor begs her not to tell his ward about their "adventure". Ossi agrees and goes upstairs where she begins to undress. The doctor comes to wake her and is astonished to see Ossi wearing a man's suit. The tables are turned when Ossi scolds him for his behavior. Giving in to the attraction he feels for her, the doctor kisses her.

DVD releases
The film was released in the US by Kino Lorber as part of the boxed set Lubitsch in Berlin in 2007 with English intertitles. It was released in the UK by Eureka's Masters of Cinema series as part of the boxed set Lubitsch in Berlin: Fairy-Tales, Melodramas, and Sex Comedies in 2010 with German intertitles and English subtitles.

External links

1918 films
German black-and-white films
German silent short films
Films directed by Ernst Lubitsch
Films of the German Empire
1910s German-language films
1918 comedy films
1918 short films
Cross-dressing in film
1910s LGBT-related films
UFA GmbH films
German comedy short films
Silent comedy films
1910s German films